Gerhard Cyliax (23 August 1934 – 17 May 2008) was a German footballer who played as a defender for Borussia Dortmund.

Honours

Club
Borussia Dortmund
 German football championship: 1963
 DFB-Pokal: 1964–65
 European Cup Winners' Cup: 1965–66

References

External links
 

1934 births
2008 deaths
German footballers
Association football defenders
SC Westfalia Herne players
SC Preußen Münster players
Borussia Dortmund players
Bundesliga players
Footballers from Dortmund
West German footballers